The Sri Lanka wood pigeon (Columba torringtoniae) is a pigeon which is an endemic resident breeding bird in the mountains of Sri Lanka.

This species nests in damp evergreen woodlands in the central highlands, building a stick nest in a tree and laying a single white egg. Its flight is quick, with the regular beats and an occasional sharp flick of the wings which are characteristic of pigeons in general. Most of its food is vegetable. Normally silent it utters an owl-like hoo call in the breeding season.

The Sri Lanka wood pigeon is 36 cm in length. Its upperparts and tail are dark grey, and the head and underparts are lilac, becoming paler on the belly. There is a black-and-white chessboard pattern on the nape.

This pigeon can be quite easily seen in the woods of the Horton Plains National Park.

In culture

In Sri Lanka, this bird is known as Manila Goya - මානිලගොයා  in Sinhala Language. This wood-pigeon in a 25c Sri Lankan postal stamp.

References 

 Birds of India by Grimmett, Inskipp and Inskipp,

External links
BirdLife Species Factsheet.

Sri Lanka wood pigeon
Birds of Sri Lanka
Endemic birds of Sri Lanka
Sri Lanka wood pigeon
Sri Lanka wood pigeon
Taxa named by Edward Frederick Kelaart